ZiZone is a crossmedia service originally started in September 2006 by Dutch cable provider @Home (which later merged into Ziggo). The platform allows members to upload video content to the ZiZone website. After moderation, a selection of the uploaded content is broadcast on the ZiZone channel of Ziggo digital television available to 1.2 million homes. Membership is free.

Currently, the service is still in the development stage. The development team is led by Dave Renkema (Manager New Product Development at Ziggo) and Duncan Callender (Owner of Big Thinking Business Development). ZiZone is scheduled for official launch in 2009.

References 
Erwin Boogert (2006-Oct-04), Emerce.nl magazine, "TV-reclame moet ZiZone.tv van Essent dragen" (in Dutch)

External links 
 Official ZiZone website
 ZiZone page on official Ziggo website

Multimedia